The Order of Cisneros is a state order of Spain created in 1944. It is named after Cardinal Francisco Jiménez de Cisneros. Primarily bestowed during the Francoist dictatorship and currently dormant, it rewarded political merit.

History 

The Order of Cisneros was established by Francisco Franco on 8 March 1944. The order was modified in 1976 to only reward politicians for merit, and was later modified again on 15 April 1977. Although the order has not been awarded since September 1977, it has not been formally abolished by the Spanish government.

Design 

The order is composed of the Eagle of Saint John atop a red Maltese cross. Adorning the cross are two sets of five arrows and a yoke is present at the tail of the eagle, in reference to the yoke and arrows, the symbol of the Catholic Monarchs of Spain which was repurposed by the Falangist movement.

Classes 

The order is composed of eight classes:

 Grand Collar
 Grand Cross
 Band
 Commendation with Plaque
 Commendation
 Ribbon
 Cross
 Gold Medal

Notable recipients 

  Emiliano José Alfaro Arregui (1977)
  Carlos Asensio Cabanillas (1956)
  José Luis de Azcárraga Bustamante (es)
  Antonio Barroso y Sánchez Guerra (1953)
  Manuel Baturone Colombo (es)
  Luis Carrero Blanco (1970)
  Andrés Casinello
  Antonio Castejón Espinosa
  Víctor Castro (1976)
  José Cuesta Monereo
  Sancho Dávila y Fernández de Celis (Commendation with Plaque, 1944)
  Luis Díez-Alegría (18 July 1967)
  Francisco Franco y Salgado Araújo (es)
  Alfredo Galera (1956)
  Rafael García Valiño
  Carlos Iniesta Cano (18 July 1969)
  José Lacalle (1956)
  Tomás de Liniers y Pidal (1974)
  José López Ortiz
  Pablo Martín Alonso (1956)
  Pedro Pimentel Zayas (es)
  Miguel Rodrigo Martínez (es)
  Camilo Menéndez Tolosa (1945)
  Mohamed Meziane
  Agustín Muñoz Grandes (1956, 1970)
  Pedro Nieto (1954)
  Pilar Primo de Rivera
  Joaquín Ríos Capapé (es)
  Eduardo Sáenz de Buruaga
  Apolinar Sáenz de Buruaga y Polanco (1956)
  Juan Bautista Sánchez de Bilbao (es) (1956)
  Gustavo Urrutia González (es)

Grand Masters
  Francisco Franco
  Juan Carlos I
  Felipe VI

Coats of arms of recipients

See also 

 Imperial Order of the Yoke and Arrows

References 

Awards established in 1944
1944 establishments in Spain
1977 disestablishments in Spain
Cisneros, Order of
Cisneros, Order of